Elliot E. "Spike" Maynard (December 8, 1942 – May 1, 2014) was an American lawyer and former judge from West Virginia. In 1996 he was elected as a Democrat to the Supreme Court of Appeals of West Virginia. A judge of West Virginia's 30th Judicial Circuit for over 16 years, he was elected as a Democrat to a 12-year term on the Supreme Court of Appeals of West Virginia in 1996.

In 2010, Maynard switched parties and won the Republican nomination to challenge longtime Democratic U.S. Representative Nick Rahall in West Virginia's 3rd congressional district. On November 2, 2010, Maynard was defeated in his election bid in the second-closest election in Rahall's political history.

Early life, education, and legal career
Maynard served in the United States Air Force Reconnaissance Group from 1961 to 1966. He received his Bachelor of Science from Florida Southern College in 1967. He served as the managing director of the Tug Valley Chamber of Commerce from 1968 to 1970. Maynard attended the West Virginia University College of Law and received his J.D. in 1974.

Maynard was an attorney in private practice from 1974 and 1981, and also served as the prosecuting attorney for Mingo County from 1976 to 1981.

Judicial career 
Maynard was appointed a judge of the 30th Judicial Circuit in 1981. He was elected in 1981 and subsequently reelected. He served on the court until 1997.

In 1996, he was elected to a 12-year term as a justice of the Supreme Court of Appeals of West Virginia. Maynard served as an associate justice until 2000, when he became the Chief Justice for a one-year term.  In 2001 Maynard returned to associate justice status.  The five justices of the Supreme Court of Appeals of West Virginia rotate, with limited exceptions, the role of Chief Justice on a one-year term basis.

Massey Energy controversy
In November 2007, Maynard voted with the majority in a 3–2 decision to reverse a $76 million judgment against Massey Energy. The judgment ($55 million plus interest) had been awarded by a Boone County jury to Harman Mining, a West Virginia coal company owned by Hugh M. Caperton.

After the Supreme Court reversed the judgment, Caperton's attorneys learned that Maynard had vacationed in the French Riviera with Don Blankenship, the CEO, chairman, and president of Massey Energy, and photos of the trip emerged. Bruce Stanley, a Pittsburgh lawyer representing Caperton, said "It is beyond the realm of human comprehension that any judge could claim any semblance of impartiality when, before casting the deciding vote in a $76 million case, he accompanies the CEO of the litigant on a luxurious trip to the French Riviera."

On January 19, 2008, following intense public scrutiny, Maynard disqualified himself from the Massey appeal. The acting chief justice appointed Circuit Judge Don Cookman to sit on the court for Caperton's rehearing petition. On January 23, 2008, the Court voted 5–0 to rehear Caperton's appeal.

Political campaigns

2008 judicial campaign
Maynard's 12-year term expired in 2009. Maynard ran for re-election and was initially the strong favorite. However, in the May 13, 2008 primary election for two seats on the court, Maynard was defeated, coming in third behind former Supreme Court Justice Margaret Workman and Huntington trial lawyer Menis Ketchum. Maynard barely edged out a political novice and West Virginia University law professor Bob Bastress.

2010 U.S. Congressional campaign

After switching his party affiliation to Republican, Maynard officially filed candidacy papers on February 1, 2010, to run for the U.S. House in the 3rd District of West Virginia. He won the party primary with 30.1% of the vote against three other candidates. Maynard has said that his campaign "is about protecting the coal industry, including all the jobs associated with it." Rahall defeated Maynard in the November general election.

Death
Maynard died at a hospital in Charleston, West Virginia on May 1, 2014.

Electoral history

References

External links
 
Campaign contributions at OpenSecrets.org
Motion Ties W. Virginia Justice to Coal Executive, Adam Liptak, New York Times, January 15, 2008
Supreme Court to rehear Massey-Caperton case, Charleston Gazette, January 24, 2008
Maynard wants to stop Washington’s ‘War on Coal’, Ken Ward Jr.,Charleston Gazette, February 1, 2010
Reminder: Spike Maynard on the Aracoma Mine fire, Ken Ward Jr.,Charleston Gazette, February 2, 2010
Justice for sale, William Kistner, American Radio Works
Opinions
Caperton v. Massey, Majority Opinion
Caperton v. Massey, Justice Starcher's Dissenting Opinion
 Caperton v. Massey, Justice Albright's Dissenting Opinion
 Caperton v. Massey, Justice Benjamin's Concurring Opinion

1942 births
2014 deaths
Military personnel from West Virginia
County prosecuting attorneys in West Virginia
People from Williamson, West Virginia
Florida Southern College alumni
West Virginia University College of Law alumni
Justices of the Supreme Court of Appeals of West Virginia
West Virginia circuit court judges
West Virginia lawyers
West Virginia Republicans
United States Air Force airmen
Chief Justices of the Supreme Court of Appeals of West Virginia
20th-century American judges
20th-century American lawyers